Valeriu Pasat (born 13 July 1958) is a Moldovan historian and politician. He held the office of Minister of Defense of Moldova in the Ciubuc and Sturza cabinets.

References 

1958 births
Living people
Moldovan Ministers of Defense
20th-century Moldovan politicians
Ambassadors of Moldova to Russia
Ambassadors of Moldova to Finland
Ambassadors to Kazakhstan
20th-century diplomats
20th-century Moldovan historians
21st-century Moldovan historians